The 1986–87 NBA season was the Mavericks' 7th season in the NBA.

After winning Game 1 in a high-scoring affair, the underdog Seattle SuperSonics took the next three games, ending the Mavericks season.

The season saw the team draft Roy Tarpley and Mark Price. However, Price would be traded to the Cleveland Cavaliers after refusing to report to Dallas.

Draft picks

Roster

Regular season

Season standings

z – clinched division title
y – clinched division title
x – clinched playoff spot

Record vs. opponents

Game log

Playoffs

|- align="center" bgcolor="#ccffcc"
| 1
| April 23
| Seattle
| W 151–129
| Mark Aguirre (28)
| Roy Tarpley (11)
| Brad Davis (9)
| Reunion Arena17,007
| 1–0
|- align="center" bgcolor="#ffcccc"
| 2
| April 25
| Seattle
| L 110–112
| Mark Aguirre (28)
| Roy Tarpley (8)
| Derek Harper (8)
| Reunion Arena17,007
| 1–1
|- align="center" bgcolor="#ffcccc"
| 3
| April 28
| @ Seattle
| L 107–117
| Derek Harper (30)
| Sam Perkins (11)
| Derek Harper (8)
| Hec Edmundson Pavilion8,150
| 1–2
|- align="center" bgcolor="#ffcccc"
| 4
| April 30
| @ Seattle
| L 98–124
| Rolando Blackman (25)
| Roy Tarpley (17)
| Derek Harper (5)
| Hec Edmundson Pavilion8,150
| 1–3
|-

Player statistics

Season

|-
| 
|| 80 || 80 || 33.3 || .495 || .353 || .770 || 5.3 || 3.2 || 1.1 || 0.4 || style="background:#0B60AD;color:#FFFFFF;" | 25.7
|-
| 
|| 30 || 0 || 5.3 || .392 || || .464 || 1.2 || 0.4 || 0.1 || 0.3 || 1.8
|-
| 
|| 80 || 80 || 34.5 || .495 || .333 || .884 || 3.5 || 3.3 || 0.8 || 0.3 || 21.0
|-
| 
|| 82 || 6 || 19.3 || .456 || .302 || .860 || 1.4 || 4.5 || 0.8 || 0.1 || 7.0
|-
| 
|| 82 || style="background:#0B60AD;color:#FFFFFF;" | 82 || style="background:#0B60AD;color:#FFFFFF;" | 36.9 || style="background:#0B60AD;color:#FFFFFF;" | .586 || || .812 || style="background:#0B60AD;color:#FFFFFF;" | 11.9 || 0.8 || 0.6 || style="background:#0B60AD;color:#FFFFFF;" | 1.7 || 10.8
|-
| 
|| 77 || 76 || 33.2 || .501 || .358 || .684 || 2.6 || style="background:#0B60AD;color:#FFFFFF;" | 7.9 || style="background:#0B60AD;color:#FFFFFF;" | 2.2 || 0.3 || 16.0
|-
| 
|| 8 || 0 || 2.8 || .222 || || .875 || 0.4 || 0.8 || 0.1 || 0.0 || 1.4
|-
| 
|| 25 || 0 || 3.6 || .400 || .294 || style="background:#0B60AD;color:#FFFFFF;" | .909 || 0.3 || 0.6 || 0.3 || 0.0 || 2.3
|-
| 
|| 80 || 80 || 33.6 || .482 || .352 || .828 || 7.7 || 1.8 || 1.4 || 1.0 || 14.8
|-
| 
|| 81 || 5 || 21.1 || .472 || style="background:#0B60AD;color:#FFFFFF;" | .478 || .742 || 3.7 || 2.0 || 0.6 || 0.2 || 9.3
|-
| 
|| 75 || 1 || 18.7 || .467 || .333 || .676 || 7.1 || 0.7 || 0.7 || 1.1 || 7.5
|-
| 
|| 58 || 0 || 9.7 || .424 || .000 || .750 || 2.2 || 0.4 || 0.2 || 0.2 || 2.7
|-
| 
|| 54 || 0 || 12.2 || .390 || .280 || .784 || 1.7 || 0.6 || 0.4 || 0.2 || 6.6
|}

Playoffs

|-
| 
|| 4 || 4 || 32.5 || .500 || .000 || .767 || 6.0 || 2.0 || style="background:#0B60AD;color:#FFFFFF;" | 2.0 || 0.0 || 21.3
|-
| 
|| 1 || 0 || 10.0 || 1.000 || || .250 || 3.0 || 0.0 || 1.0 || 1.0 || 3.0
|-
| 
|| 4 || 4 || style="background:#0B60AD;color:#FFFFFF;" | 38.3 || .493 || .000 || style="background:#0B60AD;color:#FFFFFF;" | .917 || 3.5 || 4.3 || 0.4 || 0.0 || style="background:#0B60AD;color:#FFFFFF;" | 23.5
|-
| 
|| 4 || 0 || 18.8 || .565 || .000 || .778 || 2.3 || 4.3 || 0.0 || 0.0 || 8.3
|-
| 
|| 3 || 3 || 22.7 || style="background:#0B60AD;color:#FFFFFF;" | .800 || || .889 || 5.7 || 0.7 || 0.3 || 1.0 || 5.3
|-
| 
|| 4 || 4 || 30.8 || .500 || style="background:#0B60AD;color:#FFFFFF;" | .222 || .800 || 3.0 || style="background:#0B60AD;color:#FFFFFF;" | 6.8 || 1.8 || 0.0 || 16.5
|-
| 
|| 1 || 0 || 10.0 || .200 || .000 || || 2.0 || 1.0 || 0.0 || 0.0 || 2.0
|-
| 
|| 4 || 4 || 33.3 || .500 || .000 || .696 || 8.5 || 1.3 || 1.0 || 0.3 || 17.0
|-
| 
|| 4 || 0 || 24.3 || .371 || .000 || .455 || 3.0 || 1.5 || 0.8 || 0.5 || 7.8
|-
| 
|| 4 || 1 || 28.5 || .500 || || .714 || style="background:#0B60AD;color:#FFFFFF;" | 10.5 || 0.3 || 0.3 || style="background:#0B60AD;color:#FFFFFF;" | 1.8 || 13.3
|-
| 
|| 4 || 0 || 11.8 || .500 || || .600 || 2.5 || 1.0 || 0.0 || 0.8 || 3.8
|-
|}

Awards and records
 Derek Harper, NBA All-Defensive Second Team
 Roy Tarpley, NBA All-Rookie Team 1st Team
 Rolando Blackman, NBA All-Star Game
 Mark Aguirre, NBA All-Star Game

Transactions

References

See also
 1986–87 NBA season

Dallas Mavericks seasons
Dallas
Dallas
Dallas